Songs from the Heart is a various artists compilation, released in 1998, containing love songs by artists from Columbia Records (United States). The album was marketed for Valentine's Day February 14.

Track listing
"To See You"  – 3:56 - Harry Connick, Jr.
"Sweet Love"  – 4:38 - Nancy Wilson
"Can't Help Falling in Love"  – 3:22 - Julio Iglesias
"For You"  – 3:56 - Kenny Lattimore
"Why Me"  – 4:35 - Michael Bolton
"You And The Mona Lisa"  – 4:05 - Shawn Colvin
"Me, Myself & I (Are All In Love With You)"  – 2:05 - Tony Bennett
"Jump Up Behind Me"  – 3:28 - James Taylor
"Let Your Heart Remember"  – 4:36 - Johnny Mathis
"The Unimaginable Life"  – 6:11 - Kenny Loggins
"To Make You Feel My Love"  – 3:51 - Billy Joel
"What If We Went To Italy"  – 3:38 - Mary Chapin Carpenter

External links

Media samples
 Amazon.com: Music Sampler

1998 albums